Beechwood is a stop on the Luas light rail tram system in Dublin, Ireland which serves the southern parts of Rathmines.  It opened in 2004 as a stop on the Green Line, which re-uses the alignment of the Harcourt Street railway line which closed in 1958. Beechwood Luas stop is located on the same site as a station on the old line called Rathmines and Ranelagh.

History

Railway station (1896-1958)
The Harcourt Street railway line was built by the Dublin, Wicklow and Wexford Railway and opened in 1854, running from a temporary terminus at Harcourt Road near the city centre to Bray. Rathmines and Ranelagh was added as an infill station in 1896. The station was located on an embankment to the south of Dunville Avenue.  There were station buildings on both platforms, which were accessed via a subway under the tracks with white tiles lining the walls.

The station's name was shortened to Ranelagh in 1921, and the timber platforms were replaced with concrete ones in 1943.

Closure (1959-2004)
The Harcourt Street line had declined in use throughout the early 20th centaury and was closed by CIÉ at the end of 1958.  The tracks were lifted soon after and all stations on the route were auctioned off.  In the years that followed, the buildings and platforms at Ranelagh were demolished.

Luas (2004-present)

Construction of the first phase of the Luas system commenced in 2001 and concluded in 2004.  The route chosen for the Green Line re-used the old Harcourt Street alignment between Charlemont and Stillorgan.  The stop which was built on the site of the old Ranelagh station is called Beechwood (a separate stop called Ranelagh was built around 500m up the line).  During the construction of the Luas line, the level of the track bed was lowered by several metres and the remains of the subway were demolished.  The Luas line now crosses Dunville Avenue at-grade.

The stop was built with two side platforms, which have the furniture common to all Luas stops.  The only entrance is from Dunville Avenue.  In the place of a former ticket office, a small building was built and used as a retail unit.  Currently used as a coffee shop, it opens directly onto the northbound platform and most of its trade comes from passengers awaiting their tram.

In 2018, the platforms were lengthened from 45 to 55 metres.  This was to accommodate the new longer trams introduced to boost capacity.

Future
When plans for the MetroLink were published, it was envisaged that the new line would subsume the existing Green Line from Charlemont to Sandyford.  Transport Infrastructure Ireland planned to close all level crossings on the line.  To this end, the plan was to close road access across Dunville Avenue and replace it with a footbridge.  The plan met with opposition from local businesses including the owner of the coffee shop, who argued that road closure would stifle local communication and economy.  Plans to upgrade the Green Line to Metro standards have since been postponed.

Service
Trams run every 5–10 minutes and terminate at either Parnell or Broombridge in the north, and Sandyford or Brides Glen in the south. The stop is also served by Dublin Bus routes 11, 44, and 61.

References

Luas Green Line stops in Dublin (city)
Disused railway stations in County Dublin
Railway stations opened in 1896
Railway stations closed in 1958
1896 establishments in Ireland
Railway stations in the Republic of Ireland opened in the 19th century